Arani Revenue Division is one of three revenue circle divisions in Tiruvannamalai district of Tamil Nadu, India. It comprises the taluks of Arani, Polur, Kalasapakkam and Jamunamarattur .

Tiruvannamalai district is a newly developed  Arani Revenue Division .  The Revenue Division has been restructured and the newly formed Revenue Code has been restructured for the revenue management facility.  The revenue quota was funded by the efforts of the Minister of Hindu Religious Affairs, Mr.Sevoor Ramachandran.  Edapadi c. Palanisamy.  Opened in April 2016 .  Under this Arani Revenue Code, Arani taluk, Polur taluk, Kalasapakkam taluk, Chettupattu taluk, Jamunamathur taluk  The talukas are located.  It is also the highest income earner in the Tiruvannamalai district.

References

External links
 
 

Tiruvannamalai district
Revenue divisions in Tamil Nadu